Irek Kutdusovich Ganiyev (born 16 January 1986) is a Russian former professional football player.

Club career
He made his Russian Football National League debut for FC KAMAZ Naberezhnye Chelny on 2 May 2010 in a game against FC Kuban Krasnodar.

External links
 
 

1986 births
Footballers from Kazan
Living people
Russian footballers
Association football defenders
FC KAMAZ Naberezhnye Chelny players
FC Orenburg players
FC Rubin Kazan players
FC Nizhny Novgorod (2015) players
FC Mashuk-KMV Pyatigorsk players